Cyclophorus expansus is a species of gastropod belonging to the family Cyclophoridae.

The species is found in Southeastern Asia.

References

Cyclophoridae
Gastropods of Asia
Gastropods described in 1852